Maya or Maayatan, real name Masahito Yamazaki (born July 30, 1979) is the lead singer in the Japanese visual kei electronic rock band, LM.C. He got his musical start in 1997 as a member of the underground band Sinners, before later becoming a support guitarist for musician Miyavi in his support band Ishihara Gundan (Ishihara being Miyavi's real last name, Gundan means "brigade" or "army" in Japanese). While still with Miyavi, Maya and other support members also played live shows as LM.C. Later they were joined by Aiji of Pierrot.

References

1979 births
Living people
Japanese male rock singers
Japanese male pop singers
Visual kei musicians
Place of birth missing (living people)
21st-century Japanese singers
21st-century Japanese male singers